The Kahlersberg is a  mountain in the Northern Limestone Alps (Hagen Mountains) in the Berchtesgaden Alps on the border between Germany (Bavaria) and Austria (Salzburg).

From the west a steep, marked climb (Route 496) runs through the so-called Mausloch ("Mousehole") to the summit.
The summit can also be reached along the Eisenpfad ("Iron Path"), a path which approaches from the southwest, from the Landtal valley, is very steep in places and has old markings.
A trackless descent variant runs from the Fensterl, a wind gap with a striking, small pit (in the right of the picture; the fourth wind gap left of the summit), northwards and down into the bowl between the Kahlersberg and the Hochseeleinkopf. This descent drops down mainly over steep scree.

Mountains of Bavaria
Berchtesgaden Alps
Mountains of Salzburg (state)
Two-thousanders of Austria
Berchtesgadener Land
Mountains of the Alps
Two-thousanders of Germany